Belyayevskaya is a rural locality (a village) in Razinskoye Rural Settlement, Kharovsky District, Vologda Oblast, Russia. The population was 17 as of 2002.

Geography 
Belyayevskaya is located 45 km north of Kharovsk (the district's administrative centre) by road. Podosharikha is the nearest rural locality.

References 

Rural localities in Kharovsky District